François Bouchot (1800–1842) was a French painter and engraver born in Paris in 1800. He studied engraving under Richomme, and then became a pupil of Regnault, and subsequently of Lethière, and obtained the 'grand prix de Rome' in 1823. He exhibited at the Salon from 1824 till his death, which occurred in Paris in 1842. A Drunken Silenus by him is in the Lille Gallery, and the Burial of General Marceau in the Mairie at Chartres. He was also celebrated for his portraits.

References
 

19th-century French painters
French male painters
French engravers
19th-century engravers
1800 births
1842 deaths
Painters from Paris
Prix de Rome for painting
19th-century French male artists
18th-century French male artists